Robert Farrell (1 January 1906 – 17 January 1971) was a Scottish professional footballer who played as an outside forward. He made 16 appearances in the Scottish League for Dundee and 382 in the English Football League for Brighton & Hove Albion.

Life and career
Farrell was born in Dundee. He began his football career with junior club Dundee North End before joining Dundee in 1926. According to the Dundee Courier, he was a "tall, well-built lad" who could "fill any position in the forward line, having played in junior circles on the right and left wings with equal success." He made four Division One appearances in his first season and twelve in his second, but was given a free transfer at the end of the 1927–28 season. Reports of his joining Dundee United proved premature, a trial with English First Division club Portsmouth came to nothing, and in September 1928, Farrell signed for another English club, Brighton & Hove Albion of the Third Division South.

Farrell soon established himself at outside right in Brighton's first team, and continued in place for most of the next ten years. Stan Hurst took over the position during the 1938–39 season, and Farrell retired at the end of that campaign. For much of the 1930s, he had spent his summers as twelfth man and baggage master for Sussex County Cricket Club. He became landlord of a local pub, served in the RAF during the Second World War, and was still in the licensed trade at the time of his death in 1971 at the age of 65.

References

1906 births
1971 deaths
Footballers from Dundee
Scottish footballers
Association football outside forwards
Dundee North End F.C. players
Dundee F.C. players
Brighton & Hove Albion F.C. players
Scottish Junior Football Association players
Scottish Football League players
English Football League players